Elio Filippo Accrocca (17 April 1923 – 11 March 1996) was an Italian poet, author, and translator.

Having been born in Cori, Lazio, Accrocca studied at the University of Rome under the modernist poet Giuseppe Ungaretti, who remained a core influence on his poetry.
From the mid-1950s, Accrocca began experimenting in new directions.
He was an associate of many other figures in the Italian cultural scene, among them both literary figures like Alessandro Parronchi and artists like Marco Lusini. From 1977 he taught arts at the Accademia di belle arti di Foggia where he also worked as its director. Accrocca died in Rome, aged 72.

Bibliography

Poetry
Portonaccio, Scheiwiller, Milan 1949;
Caserma 1950, Quaderni del Canzoniere, Rome 1951;
Reliquia umana, Scheiwiller, Milan 1955;
Ritorno a Portonaccio, Mondadori, Milan 1959;
Innestogrammi-Corrispondenze, Rebellato, Padova 1966;
Del Guardare in faccia, De Luca, Rome 1969;
Europa inquieta, "I Tormargana", Rome 1972;
Paradigma, Origine, Lussemburgo 1972;
Roma così, preface by Mario Petrucciani, critical text of Salvatore Quasimodo, De Luca, Rome 1973;
Due parole dall'al di qua, preface by Mario Petrucciani, Lacaita, Manduria 1973;
Siamo non siamo, preface by Giorgio Petrocchi, Rusconi, Varese 1974;
Versi mignotti, Il Blocchetto, Rome 1975;
Bicchiere di carta, Quaderni di Piazza Navona, Rome 1977;
Il discorrere delle cose, with 10 engravings by Ida Gerosa, Rome 1978;
Il superfluo, presentazione di Sergio Antonielli, Mondadori, Milano 1980;
Scultogrammi, with 5 etchings by Alba Gonzales, Rome 1981;
I binari di Apollinaire, Quaderni di Piazza Navona, Rome 1982;
Pesominimo, Piovan Editore, Abano Terme, 1983;
Treangoli, con 2 acqueforti di Walter Piacesi, Ediz. Ca' Spinello, Urbino 1983;
Videogrammi della prolunga, Lucarini, Rome 1984;
Bagage, Quaderni di Carte d'Europa, Il Ventaglio, Rome 1984;
Esercizi radicali, Bastogi, Foggia 1984; 
Transeuropa, introduction by Cosma Siani, trad. in olandese di N. Morina-Oostveen, Euroeditor, Lussemburgo 1984;
Segni / Stagioni, Trifalco, Roma 1985;
Copia difforme, introduction by Dino Carlesi, critical noted by Luigi Blasucci, Giardini, Pisa 1986;
Contromano, Editrice Nuova Fortezza, Livorno 1987;
Forse arrivi forse partenze, introduction by Antonio Errico, Ediz. Il Laboratorio, Parabita 1988;
Poesie. La distanza degli anni (1942-1987), raccolta, Newton Compton, Rome 1988;
Un fagotto di carta, Tacchi Editore, Pisa 1991;
Lo sdraiato di pietra,  Newton Compton, Rome 1991;
Linea di condotta, (poesie 1942-1990), introduction by Riccardo Scrivano, edited by Angelo Bellettato, Edizioni dei Dioscuri, Sora 1991;
Epi-anagrammi, Newton Compton, Rome 1993;
Nella zona inquieta, edited by Pasquale Cominale, Ed. Centro Studi e Relazioni Culturali ERRE 80 di Caserta, Caserta 1994;
Un fagotto di carta & un po' d'inchiostro e altre poesie, edited by Carmine Mario Mulière, EA Edizioni d'Arte, Rome 1999.

Translated works
 La vita dalla vita, by Mihai Beniuc, (antologia poetica), in collaboration with Dragos Vranceanu, Edizioni Rapporti Europei, Rome 1962;
Il sorriso di Hiroshima e altre poesie, by Eugen Jebeleanu, in collaboration with Dragos Vranceanu, Guanda, Parma 1970;
Prima che venga l'autunno, by Damian Damianov, Bulzoni, Rome 1985;
La ronda notturna, by Lijubomir Lelvcev, Bulzoni, Roma 1986

References

External links

Page from the National Library Center in Rome

Italian male poets
1923 births
1996 deaths
20th-century Italian poets
20th-century Italian male writers